Kevin Horan (born October 29, 1961) is an American attorney and politician serving as a member of the Mississippi House of Representatives from the 34th district. He assumed office in January 2012. Horan previously represented the 24th district from 2012 to 2016.

Early life and education 
Horan was born in Water Valley, Mississippi in 1961 and attended Water Valley High School. He earned a Bachelor of Business Administration degree from the University of Mississippi and a Juris Doctor from the Mississippi College School of Law.

Career 
Outside of politics, Horan is an attorney at Horan & Horan. He was also the CFO of Milestone Hospice. Horan was elected to the Mississippi House of Representatives in 2011 and assumed office in 2012. Initially elected as a Democrat, Horan registered as an independent in 2020 and later as a Republican. Horan also serves as chair of the House Corrections Committee.

References 

Living people
1961 births
People from Water Valley, Mississippi
People from Grenada, Mississippi
University of Mississippi alumni
Mississippi College School of Law alumni
Mississippi lawyers
Mississippi Republicans
Mississippi Democrats
Members of the Mississippi House of Representatives